Great Gonzos! The Best of Ted Nugent is the first compilation album by American rock musician Ted Nugent, collecting his best-known tracks from his time with Epic Records. The album was originally released in 1981 with ten tracks and reissued in 1999 with three bonus tracks.

Track listing 
All songs written by Ted Nugent, except "Baby Please Don't Go" by Big Joe Williams and "Give Me Just a Little" by Nugent, Neal Schon, Tommy Shaw and Jack Blades

"Cat Scratch Fever" – 3:39 (from the 1977 album Cat Scratch Fever)
"Just What the Doctor Ordered" – 3:42 (from the 1975 album Ted Nugent)
"Free-for-All" – 3:21 (from the 1976 album Free-for-All)
"Dog Eat Dog" – 4:03 (from the 1976 album Free-for-All)
"Motor City Madhouse" – 4:27 (from the 1975 album Ted Nugent)
"Paralyzed" – 4:11 (from the 1979 album State of Shock)
"Stranglehold" – 8:24 (from the 1975 album Ted Nugent)
"Baby Please Don't Go" (live) – 5:58 (from the 1978 live album Double Live Gonzo!)
"Wango Tango" – 4:49 (from the 1980 album Scream Dream)
"Wang Dang Sweet Poontang (live) – 6:27 (from the 1978 live album Double Live Gonzo!)

Rob Grange appears on Tracks 1, 2, 3, 5, 7, 8, 9 and 10

1999 CD reissue bonus tracks 
 "Yank Me, Crank Me" (live) – 4:39 (from the 1978 live album Double Live Gonzo!)
"Home Bound" – 4:41 (from the 1977 album Cat Scratch Fever)
"Give Me Just a Little" – 3:48 (newly recorded in 1999 for the purposes of this reissue)

Rob Grange appears on Tracks 11 and 12

Sales certifications

References 

1981 greatest hits albums
Ted Nugent albums
Epic Records compilation albums